The 2010 World Netball Series was the second edition of the World Netball Series, an annual international netball competition held under fastnet rules. The 2010 event was held in Liverpool, England, and was contested between the top six national netball teams according to the IFNA World Rankings. After two days of round-robin matches, Jamaica and England finished on top of the standings. However, the 2010 tournament was won by New Zealand, who defeated Jamaica in the semi-final and England in the grand final.

Overview

Date and venue
The 2010 World Netball Series was played in Liverpool over three days, from 19–21 November. Matches were held at the Echo Arena Liverpool, which has a seating capacity of 7,500 for sporting events.

Format
The tournament comprised 20 matches played over three days from 19–21 November. Each of the six teams played each other once during the first two days in a round-robin format. At the end of two days, the four highest-ranked teams from this stage progress to the finals, played on the final day of competition, in which the 1st-ranked team play the 4th-ranked team, while 2nd plays 3rd. The winners of these two matches contested the Grand Final; the remaining teams competed in third- and fifth-place playoffs.

Teams
The top six international netball teams contest the World Netball Series each year. Five teams returned from the previous tournament; Samoa was replaced by South Africa in 2010. England, Jamaica and Malawi sent near full-strength teams for the tournament; Australia and New Zealand sent development teams, while South Africa had several top players unavailable.

Results

Final placings

Medallists

References

External links
 Official website

2010
World
World
International sports competitions in Liverpool
2010 in Australian netball
2010 in New Zealand netball
2010 in English netball
2010 in South African women's sport
2010 in Malawian sport
2010 in Jamaican sport